The 1989 Bangalore Mahanagara Palike (Bangalore City Corporation) election was held in May 1989 for all 87 wards of Bangalore.

Background 
In 1989, the BMP expanded to include 87 wards. The tenure of the Bangalore Mahanagara Palike ended in 1988. A new election was necessary to elect new Corporators and Mayor

Organization 
New Mayor will be elected for a term of one year and Corporators will be in office for 5 years

Schedule 
The schedule of the election was announced by the State Election Commission in March 1989 and date of counting / announcement of result was in May 1989

Results

See also 
 List of wards in Bangalore (1989-1995)
 List of wards in Bangalore (1995-2006)
 List of wards in Bangalore
 Elections in Karnataka
 Bangalore Mahanagara Palike

References

1980s in Karnataka
1980s in Bangalore
1989 elections in India
Elections in Bangalore